Nauradehi Wildlife Sanctuary, covering about , is the largest wildlife sanctuary of Madhya Pradesh state in India. This wildlife sanctuary is a part of 5500 km2 of forested landscape. It is located in the centre of the state covering parts of Sagar, Damoh, Narsinghpur, and Raisen Districts. It is about 90 km from Jabalpur and about 56 km from Sagar.

It is a potential site for the Cheetah Reintroduction in India. The cheetah prey density were reasonable and based on current prey density the area could support about 25 cheetahs. 750 km2 area was recommended by relocation of 23 villages. After relocating the species, the site could support over 50 cheetahs and Nauradehi could harbour over 70 individuals.

The wildlife refuge is divided into six ranges:
 Mohli Range,
 Singpur Range,
 Jhapan Range,
 Sarra Range,
 D'Gaon Range,
 Nauradehi Range

History
This forest area was made a sanctuary in 1975.

Geography
The protected area sits astride two major river basins of India, namely the Narmada, flowing west to the Arabian Sea and the Ganges, flowing east to the Bay of Bengal. Three-fourths of the wildlife sanctuary falls in the basin of Ganges tributary, the Yamuna River, of which the Ken River is a tributary, and one fourth of the sanctuary falls in the Naramada basin. The north flowing Kopra River, Bamner River, Vyarma River and Bearma River, which are tributaries of the Ken River, are the major rivers of this protected area. Some smaller streams flow southerly to the Narmada river in the south of the sanctuary.

The forest is spread over the southern area of the Vindhya Range of  hills in which the Bandhavgarh National Park and Panna National Park are also located.
 
The seasons here are: 
Winter - November to February,  to 

Flora

The flora consists of central Indian Monsoon forests, which include tropical dry deciduous forest. Major trees found are teak, saja, dhawda, sal, tendu (Coromandel ebony), bhirra (East Indian satinwood) and mahua. In March the deciduous trees begin to shed their leaves for a hot summer season.

The sanctuary exists as fragmented patches of variable density forest. The sanctuary needs more research and study of its habitats, flora, fauna and avi-fauna.

Fauna
Indian wolf is the keystone species of Nauradehi Wildlife Sanctuary. Other carnivores here include: Bengal tiger, Indian leopard, striped hyena, wild dog (Dhole), Bengal fox, Muggar crocodile, golden jackal, and bears. The tiger and the leopards are conspicuous by their absence though infrequent evidences are met with. Recently a tigress was found dead due to old age. Other fauna often seen is smooth Indian otter, sloth bear and Indian grey mongoose.  
Herbivores living here include: Four-horned antelope (Chousingha), nilgai (blue bull), chinkara (Indian gazelle), sambar deer, blackbuck antelope, barking deer, grey langur, rhesus macaque, chital (spotted deer) and wild boar. 

Reptile species found in Nauradehi includes monitor lizard,  mugger crocodile, turtle, tortoise and snakes.

Birds of Nauradehi 
Due to presence of perennial water sources including several rivers and Cheola lake, there are a great number of birds in the protected area. Bird groups found there include: eagles, vultures, storks, cranes, egrets, lapwings, kites, owls, kingfishers, quails and doves.

At least 150 bird species can be seen in Noradehi. Some of the birds are king vulture, Egyptian vulture (E), white-rumped vulture long billed vulture, (CR), lesser adjutant stork (V), painted stork, open-billed stork, spotted owl, barred jungle owlet, black-winged kite, Indian pond heron, green sandpiper, Indian pied myna, common myna, wood sandpiper, red-wattled lapwing, yellow wagtail, purple sunbird, white breasted kingfisher, stork-billed kingfisher, black drongo, Indian robin, long-tailed shrike, black ibis, rock pigeon, Indian peafowl, grey francolin, jungle babbler, golden oriole, spotted dove, Indian roller, magpie, paddyfield pipit, crested serpent eagle, jungle crow, Asian green bee-eater, honey buzzard, changeable hawk eagle, shikra, paradise flycatcher, verditer flycatcher, black naped monarch, common woodshrike, plum headed parakeet, rose ringed parakeet and greater coucal. The spotted grey creeper, a rare bird, is also found here.   

During winter season the sanctuary serves as the seasonal home for migratory birds, including the sarus crane.

Visitor information 
The park is open from November to June. The best time to visit is winter i.e. November to February when it is not too hot and trees are still green. The sanctuary closes during monsoon from July till October to give trees and animals time to reacclimatize.

Jabalpur or Bhopal can be convenient bases to explore the sanctuary, which have airports. Nearby railheads include Sagar, Damoh and Narsinghpur.

Forest Rest Houses and Forest Department guides are available for visitors to Noradehi.

References

Project Cheetah (Brochure), September 2010, Ministry of Environment and Forests, Government of India. Accessed 01 Feb 2011.
Reintroducing the Cheetah in India
Assessing the potential for reintroducing the cheetah in India, 2010. A report on the feasibility of cheetah reintroduction in India, jointly prepared by the Wildlife Trust of India (WTI) and Wildlife Institute of India (WII), and submitted to the Ministry of Environment and Forests, Government of India (Ranjitsinh, M. K. & Jhala, Y. V. (2010) Assessing the potential for reintroducing the cheetah in India. Wildlife Trust of India, Noida, & the Wildlife Institute of India, Dehradun, TR2010/001). Also available at WII website: , . Accessed 01 Feb 2011. Also available at Ministry of Environment and Forests (India) website:  Accessed 20 Sept 2011.

External sources
Nauradehi Sanctuary MP Forest department
Nauradehi Wildlife Sanctuary (Penthouse.in)
Noradehi Birds Checklist, 120 species

Wildlife sanctuaries in Madhya Pradesh
Cheetah reintroduction in India
Tourist attractions in Sagar district
1975 establishments in Madhya Pradesh
Protected areas established in 1975